W. T. Askins House is a historic home located at Lake City, Florence County, South Carolina.  It was built about 1895, and is a two-story, L-shaped, frame  Folk Victorian style dwelling.  It is clad with shiplap siding and set upon a brick pier foundation.  Also on the property are a gable-front garage and a smoke house.  It was the home of William Thomas Askins (1859–1932), a prominent merchant and farmer of Lake City and lower Florence County.

It was listed on the National Register of Historic Places in 1995.

References

Houses on the National Register of Historic Places in South Carolina
Victorian architecture in South Carolina
Houses completed in 1895
Houses in Florence County, South Carolina
National Register of Historic Places in Florence County, South Carolina